Rosemary Lane (born Rosemary Mullican; April 4, 1913 – November 25, 1974) was an American actress and singer. One of the Lane Sisters, she is known for her performances with her sisters Lola and Priscilla Lane, her work with Fred Waring's Pennsylvanians, and for her film career in the 1930s to 1940s.

Early years
Rosemary and one of her sisters, Priscilla, traveled to Des Moines every weekend to study dancing with Rose Lorenz, a renowned dance teacher at the time. The girls made their first professional appearance September 30, 1930, at Des Moines' Paramount Theater. Rosemary, then 17, performed on stage as part of the entertainment accompanying the release of her sister Lola's Hollywood movie Good News (1930). Rosemary, a member of the National Honor Society, graduated from Indianola High in 1931 and attended Simpson College for a while, playing on the freshman basketball team.

In the meantime, Cora had left her husband and in 1932, accompanied by Rosemary, arrived in New York. Cora immediately went to work pushing her two young daughters into attending auditions for various prospective Broadway productions, without success. It was while the girls were trying out numbers at a music publishing office that Fred Waring, an orchestra leader, heard them harmonizing. He found them attractive and individually talented. In early 1933 with Cora's approval they were signed to a contract with Waring. Cora acted as chaperone to Rosemary and Priscilla who at this time adopted the name Lane.

Fred Waring not only toured with his band, known as "The Pennsylvanians", but had a weekly radio show. Priscilla quickly became known as the comedienne of the group. Rosemary sang the ballads while Priscilla performed the swing numbers and wisecracked with Waring and various guests. Dr. Mullican instituted divorce proceedings against his wife on the grounds of desertion, and the divorce was granted in 1933.

Film career
Rosemary and Priscilla remained with Fred Waring for almost five years. In 1937, Waring was engaged by Warner Bros. in Hollywood to appear with his entire band in Varsity Show, a musical starring Dick Powell. Both Rosemary and Priscilla were tested and awarded feature roles in the film. Lane shared the romantic passages with Powell, while Priscilla played a high-spirited college girl.

Warner Bros. purchased Priscilla and Rosemary's contract from Fred Waring and signed them to seven-year contracts. Lane's next film was the musical Hollywood Hotel, in which she co-starred with sister Lola and Powell, before starring in Gold Diggers in Paris, opposite Rudy Vallee.

Also in 1938, Priscilla, Rosemary and third sister Lola Lane appeared as three of four sisters (the fourth being Gale Page) in Four Daughters, the similarly themed Daughters Courageous the following year, and two sequels to Four Daughters a few years later, Four Wives and Four Mothers.

Upon completion of this film Warners sent Priscilla, Rosemary, Errol Flynn, and Ann Sheridan among others on a personal appearance tour in conjunction with the release of Flynn's first western Dodge City. 

Lane earned good reviews for 1940's The Boys from Syracuse, based on Rodgers and Hart's Broadway hit of 1938. The next year she made an unusual move for a film actress of her era by becoming a Broadway star in the musical Best Foot Forward, as Gale Joy, which opened on Broadway at the Ethel Barrymore Theatre on October 1, 1941. It closed after 326 performances on the Fourth of July 1942. However, she lost the subsequent movie role to Lucille Ball. Good movie roles dwindled and Lane closed out her film career in 1945 with Sing Me a Song of Texas, as nightclub singer Laurie Lang, the niece of a wealthy Texas rancher. She began a career selling real estate from an office in Pacific Palisades.

Personal life
Lane married Hollywood makeup artist George H. "Bud" Westmore on December 28, 1941. The marriage lasted 13 years and produced a daughter, Bridget Westmore. She sued Westmore for separate maintenance in November 1952, saying he walked out on her four months earlier. Frank Westmore, in his book The Westmores of Hollywood, said Lane and Westmore "had been very happy, or so everyone thought, including Rosemary." The couple went through a messy divorce in 1954.

Death
Lane died of diabetes and pulmonary obstruction at Motion Picture Country Hospital on November 25, 1974 in Woodland Hills, California at the age of 61. She was buried in an unmarked grave at Forest Lawn Memorial Park in Glendale, California with a grave marker finally placed on 2012.

Filmography

References

External links

 

1914 births
1974 deaths
Actresses from Iowa
Actresses from Indiana
American film actresses
Deaths from diabetes
Warner Bros. contract players